Ashley Viola Gantt (born ) is an American lawyer, politician, and former schoolteacher. She is the District 109 Representative in the Florida House of Representatives.

Early life and education 
Gantt earned a B.A. in English from the University of Florida in 2007. She joined the Teach For America Mississippi Delta Corps for two years. She taught as a middle school and high school teacher for six years at Miami-Dade County Public Schools before beginning law school. Gantt completed a J.D. at the Shepard Broad College of Law in 2016.

In the 2022 Florida House of Representatives election, she criticized incumbent representative James Bush for voting with Republicans on the recent abortion ban legislation and the Florida Parental Rights in Education Act. On August 23, 2022, she won the Democratic primary for District 109. She was backed by Service Employees International Union and Ruth’s List Florida. Gantt has no opponents in the general election.

Political career 

{|-

References

External links

Living people
Place of birth missing (living people)
Nova Southeastern University alumni
Schoolteachers from Florida
21st-century American women lawyers
21st-century American lawyers
21st-century African-American women
21st-century African-American politicians
21st-century American politicians
African-American people in Florida politics
Women in Florida politics
21st-century American women educators
21st-century American educators
African-American schoolteachers
University of Florida alumni
Teach For America alumni
Democratic Party members of the Florida House of Representatives
1985 births